Ricki Olsen (born 21 October 1988) is a Danish professional footballer. He is the son of the former Denmark national team player Lars Olsen.

Career
Olsen started his career with Brøndby IF, but did not play any senior games for the team. Randers FC signed Olsen from Brøndby IF in the summer of 2008. Olsen got his first match on 26 October against Aalborg BK. Olsen played 75 minutes before being replaced by teammate Alain Behi. Olsen got his first goal for the club on 1 March against AGF when he scored the winning goal from about 30 yards out. The game ended 2–1.

In January 2012, he signed a contract with Næstved BK in the 1st Division. He then played for Nordvest FC and FC Helsingør.

In the summer of 2018 he left FC Helsingør following the club's relegation from the Danish Superliga. He then signed a contract with HB Køge in the Danish 1st Division. He returned to FC Helsingør for the 2019–20 season.

On 29 July 2020, it was confirmed, that Olsen had joined Ishøj IF in the Denmark Series. He left the club at the end of 2022.

References

External links
 

1988 births
Living people
Danish men's footballers
Denmark under-21 international footballers
Brøndby IF players
Randers FC players
Viborg FF players
Næstved Boldklub players
FC Helsingør players
HB Køge players
Ishøj IF players
Danish Superliga players
Danish 1st Division players
Danish 2nd Division players
Denmark Series players
Association football midfielders
Holbæk B&I players